María Cristina Estela Marcela Jurado García (16 January 1924 – 5 July 2002), known professionally as Katy Jurado, was a Mexican actress. Jurado began her acting career in Mexico during the Golden Age of Mexican cinema. In 1951, she was recruited by American filmmakers in Mexico and began her Hollywood career during the Golden Age of Hollywood. She acted in popular Western films of the 1950s and 1960s. Her talent for playing a variety of characters helped pave the way for Mexican actresses in American cinema. She was the first Latin American actress nominated for an Oscar, as Best Supporting Actress for her work in Broken Lance (1954), and was the first to win a Golden Globe Award, for her performance in High Noon (1952).

Life and career

1924–1951: Childhood and Mexican films 
María Cristina Estela Marcela Jurado García, known from early childhood as "Katy", was born on 16 January 1924, in Guadalajara Mexico, the daughter of Luis Jurado Ochoa, a lawyer, and Vicenta García, a singer. Jurado's younger brothers were Luis Raúl and Óscar Sergio.
Her mother was a singer who worked for the Mexican radio station XEW (the oldest radio station in Latin America). Her mother was sister of Mexican musician Belisario de Jesús García, author of popular Mexican songs such as "Las Cuatro Milpas". Jurado's cousin Emilio Portes Gil was President of Mexico (1928–1930).

Jurado studied at a school run by nuns in the Guadalupe Inn neighborhood of Mexico City, and later studied to be a bilingual secretary. As a teenager, she was invited to work as an actress by producers and filmmakers, among them Emilio Fernández, who offered her a role in his first movie The Isle of Passion (1941). Although her godfather was Mexican actor Pedro Armendáriz, her parents never gave their consent.
Another filmmaker interested in her was Mauricio de la Serna, who offered her a role in the film No matarás (1943). She signed the contract without authorization from her parents, and when they found out, they threatened to send her to a boarding school in Monterrey. Around this time, she met the aspiring actor Víctor Velázquez and married him soon afterward. Her marriage was largely motivated by the desire to continue a career as an actress and to escape the yoke of her parents. Velazquez was the father of her children, Victor Hugo and Sandra. The marriage ended in 1943, shortly after Jurado began her film career.

No matarás was the first in a series of Mexican films in which Jurado exploited her exotic beauty. She specialized in playing wicked and seductive women. Jurado said:

She appeared in 16 more films over the next seven years in what film historians have named the Golden Age of Mexican cinema. She acted with acclaimed Mexican film stars such as Pedro Infante, Sara Montiel, Pedro Armendáriz and others. In 1953, she starred in Luis Buñuel's film El Bruto, for which she received an Ariel Award for Best Supporting Actress, Mexico's equivalent of an Academy Award.

1951–1968: Success in Hollywood 

In addition to acting, Jurado worked as a movie columnist, radio reporter and bullfight critic to support her family. She was on assignment when filmmaker Budd Boetticher and actor John Wayne spotted her at a bullfight. Neither knew she was an actress. However, Boetticher, who was also a professional bullfighter, cast Jurado in his 1951 film Bullfighter and the Lady, opposite Gilbert Roland, as the wife of an aging matador. She had rudimentary English language skills and memorized and delivered her lines phonetically. Despite this handicap, her strong performance brought her to the attention of Hollywood producer Stanley Kramer, who cast her in the classic Western High Noon (1952), starring Gary Cooper and Grace Kelly. Jurado learned to speak English for the role, studying and taking classes two hours per day for two months. She played saloon owner Helen Ramírez, former love of reluctant hero Cooper's Will Kane. She earned a Golden Globe Award for Best Supporting Actress and gained notice in the American movie industry.

In 1953, she had a role in Arrowhead with Charlton Heston and Jack Palance, playing an evil Comanche woman, the love interest of Heston's character. The next year in 1954, Jurado was chosen to play Spencer Tracy's Comanche wife in the film Broken Lance, directed by Edward Dmytryk. The role was intended for Dolores del Río, but the U.S. government, accusing del Rio of being a communist sympathizer at the height of the McCarthy era, refused permission for her to work in the United States. Jurado was selected for the role despite the resistance of the studio because of her youth. After viewing footage of her scenes, studio executives were impressed. Her performance garnered an Academy Award nomination. Jurado was the first Latin American actress to compete for the Oscar.

In the same year, Jurado appeared with Kirk Douglas in the Henry Hathaway film The Racers. In 1955, Jurado filmed Trial, directed by Mark Robson, with Glenn Ford. It was a drama about a Mexican boy accused of raping a white girl, with Jurado playing the mother of the accused. For this role, she was nominated for the Golden Globe Award for Best Supporting Actress.
In the same year, she traveled to Italy for the filming of Trapeze, directed by Carol Reed, with Burt Lancaster and Tony Curtis.

In 1956, Jurado appeared on Broadway in the play The Best House in Naples (1956), by Eduardo de Filippo.

As Jurado's Hollywood career continued, she specialized more in Western films. She participated in Man from Del Rio (1956), opposite Anthony Quinn, and Dragoon Wells Massacre (1957) with Barry Sullivan. In 1957, she debuted on television with a guest appearance in an episode of Playhouse 90. In 1959, she acted in an episode of The Rifleman, written and directed by Sam Peckinpah. In 1958, she acted in The Badlanders, with Alan Ladd and Ernest Borgnine, with whom Jurado was in a relationship. In 1959, Marlon Brando, with whom Jurado maintained a close friendship, invited her to participate in One-Eyed Jacks, his first film as director. After marrying Borgnine, they founded their own production company called Sanvio Corp. The couple traveled to Italy, where they partnered with the producer Dino de Laurentiis in Barabbas (where both acted with Anthony Quinn), and I braganti Italiani, directed by Mario Camerini.

In 1961, Jurado returned to Mexico and filmed Y dios la llamó Tierra (1961) and La Bandida (1963).

In 1962 she appeared as the historical character La Tules in an episode of Death Valley Days.

Her stormy marriage with Borgnine ended in 1963. Depressed, Jurado returned to Mexico and established her residence in the city of Cuernavaca.

In 1965, Jurado returned to Hollywood for the film Smoky, directed by George Sherman, starring Fess Parker. In 1966, she played the mother of George Maharis's character in A Covenant with Death. In 1968, she appeared in the film Stay Away, Joe in the role of the half-Apache stepmother of Elvis Presley's character.

1970–2002: Later years 
In the next years Jurado alternated her work between Hollywood and Mexico. In 1970, she filmed The Bridge in the Jungle. In 1973, she appeared in Pat Garrett and Billy the Kid, directed by Sam Peckinpah.

Jurado received one of her better dramatic roles in the third of the three short stories comprising the Mexican film Fé, Esperanza y Caridad (1973). Directed by Jorge Fons, Jurado was cast as a lower-class woman who suffers a series of bureaucratic abuses as she tries to claim the remains of her dead husband. For this performance, she won the Ariel Award for Best Actress, her second Silver Ariel Award of the Mexican Cinema.

In 1973, Jurado starred on Broadway again in the Tennessee Williams play The Red Devil Battery Sign, with Anthony Quinn and Claire Bloom.

In 1974, Jurado appeared in the American film Once Upon a Scoundrel (1974). In 1975, she participated in the film Los albañiles, again directed by Jorge Fons. The film was awarded the Golden Bear of the Berlinale 1975. In 1976, she played the role of Chuchupe in the film Pantaleón y Las Visitadoras, an adaptation of the novel Captain Pantoja and the Special Service by Mario Vargas Llosa, who also directed the film. In 1978, she played a small role in the film The Children of Sanchez. Jurado also appeared on television frequently in the 1970s.

In 1980, Jurado filmed La Seducción, directed by Arturo Ripstein, for which she was nominated for another Ariel Award for Best Actress.

Her son Victor Hugo died tragically in an accident on a highway near Monterrey in 1981. This tragedy plunged her into a deep depression that she could never overcome and led her to abandon her acting career for a few years. She later said:

In 1984, John Huston convinced her to resume her career as an actress. She acted in Huston's film Under the Volcano. In the same year, she co-starred in the short-lived television series a.k.a. Pablo, a sitcom with Paul Rodriguez.

In the 1990s, Jurado appeared in two Mexican telenovelas. In 1992, she was honored with the Golden Boot Award for her notable contribution to the Western genre. In 1998, she completed a Spanish-language film for director Arturo Ripstein titled El Evangelio de las Maravillas. She won her second Ariel Award for Best Supporting Actress for this role.

Jurado had a cameo in the film The Hi-Lo Country (1998) by Stephen Frears, who called her his "lucky charm" for his first Western.

In 2002, she made her final film appearance in Un secreto de Esperanza. The film was released posthumously.

Personal life 

Jurado's first husband was the Mexican actor Victor Velázquez, who was the stepfather of the popular Mexican actresses Tere and Lorena Velázquez. With Velázquez she had two children, Víctor Hugo (d. 1981) and Sandra.

Early in her career in Hollywood, Jurado had affairs with the filmmaker Budd Boetticher and actor Tyrone Power.

Marlon Brando was smitten with Jurado after seeing her in High Noon. They met when Brando was in Mexico filming Viva Zapata! (1952). He was involved at the time with Movita Castaneda, and was having a parallel relationship with Rita Moreno. Brando told Joseph L. Mankiewicz that he was attracted to "her enigmatic eyes, black as hell, pointing at you like fiery arrows". Jurado commented:

However, their first date became the beginning of an extended affair that lasted many years and peaked at the time they worked together on One-Eyed Jacks (1960), a film directed by Brando.

During the filming of the movie Vera Cruz (1954) in Mexico, Jurado met the American actor Ernest Borgnine, who became her second husband on 31 December 1959. Although initially their relationship was harmonious, the situation became complicated over the course of their marriage. The temperament of both led to numerous violent confrontations, some of which were documented by the newspapers of the time. Jurado claimed to have suffered physical violence from Borgnine during their marriage. Jurado and Borgnine divorced in 1963.

Jurado had a romantic relationship with the Western novelist Louis L'Amour. She said: "I have love letters that he wrote me until the last day of his life."

Jurado claimed to have been one of the people to find the body of Mexican actress Miroslava Stern after her suicide. According to Jurado, the picture that Stern had between her hands was of Cantinflas, but artistic manager Fanny Schatz exchanged the photo for one of the Spanish bullfighter Luis Miguel Dominguín.

Death 
Toward the end of her life, Jurado suffered from heart and lung ailments. She died of kidney failure and pulmonary disease on 5 July 2002 at the age of 78 at her home in Cuernavaca, Mexico. She was buried in Cuernavaca at the Panteón de la Paz cemetery.

Legacy 

Jurado has a star on the Hollywood Walk of Fame at 7065 Hollywood Boulevard for her contributions to motion pictures.

In 1953, Jurado was captured in a portrait by Mexican artist Diego Rivera.

In 1998, Mexican singer-songwriter, Juan Gabriel, composed a song for her titled, "Que rechula es Katy (What a beauty is Katy)".

She was honored with a Google Doodle on 16 January 2018.

Filmography

References

Citations

Works cited 
 
 
 
 :

Further reading

External links 

 
 
 
 

1924 births
2002 deaths
20th Century Studios contract players
20th-century American actresses
Actresses from Guadalajara, Jalisco
American actresses of Mexican descent
American film actresses
American television actresses
Ariel Award winners
Best Supporting Actress Golden Globe (film) winners
Deaths from kidney failure
Golden Age of Mexican cinema
Golden Ariel Award winners
Hispanic and Latino American actresses
Metro-Goldwyn-Mayer contract players
Mexican emigrants to the United States
Mexican film actresses
Mexican stage actresses
Mexican telenovela actresses
Mexican television actresses
Western (genre) film actresses